Aleotti is an Italian surname. Notable people with the surname include:

Alessandro Aleotti (born 1972), Italian singer
Antonio Aleotti (died 1527), Italian painter
Giovan Battista Aleotti (1546-1636), Italian architect
Massimiliana Landini Aleotti (born c. 1942), Italian billionaire heir
Vittoria Aleotti (c.1575-1620)

Italian-language surnames